Tanshinones are a class of chemical compounds.  Examples include dihydrotanshinone, tanshinone I, or tanshinone IIA. These compounds are all naturally occurring and can all be isolated from Salvia miltiorrhiza.  

Dihydrotanshinone I has been reported to have cytotoxicity to a variety of tumor cells. 

Tanshinone I is anti-inflammatory, and modulates or prevents breast cancer metastasis by regulating adhesion molecules.

Tanshinone IIA is anti-inflammatory, an antioxidant, and cytotoxic against a variety of cell lines.

References

External links
 

Furans